Jabalpur Municipal Corporation is the Municipal Corporation responsible for the civic infrastructure and administration of the city of Jabalpur, located in Madhya Pradesh, India. The organization is known, in short, as JMC. JMC's mayor is Congress leader Jagat Bahadur Annu. The current collector of Jabalpur is Karmveer Sharma.
Jabalpur was one of the first municipalities in India, founded in 1864. The mayor post is held by the Indian National Congress whereas the Bharatiya Janata Party has a majority in the municipal corporation.

Overview
The city is currently divided into 79 wards. Each ward elects a corporator. The winning party elects a council of members, who are responsible for various departments. The council members chose the Mayor among themselves. At present, there are seventy nine members in the council. The Commissioner of Jabalpur is the highest officer of Municipal Corporate Office, which is responsible for the departments of public works, revenue and tax, water supply, planning and development, fire brigade, health and sanitation, finance and accounts etc.

History

Pre-independence
Jabalpur Municipal Corporation was established as Jabalpur Municipal Committee under Lucknow Nagar Palika Act of 1864 under which Dy. Commissioner was named as Chairman of Municipality. W. H. Newhard became the first person to hold the post.

The first pre-independence Nagar Palika president of Jabalpur was Lt. Babu Kanchedi Lal Jain of Lal Bangla.

In the year 1935 the state government took over the total administration of the Municipal Committee, and Murli Manohar Seth was appointed as its administrator.

Post-independence
After Independence, in 1948 the Nagar Palika Act (Act No.3-1948) was passed. Under this Act on 1 June 1950 Jabalpur Nagar Nigam was established and the city was divided into 30 wards. A 43-member committee was set up in which 34 members were directly elected, 6 were selected members, and 3 nominated members.
On 20 October 1959 in a special called meeting, the motto of the organization was decided as Anirvedah Shriyomoolam.

Election results

Municipal Corporation

2014

2022

Mayoral election

2014

2022

Functions 
Jabalpur Municipal Corporation is created for the following functions:

 Planning for the town including its surroundings which are covered under its Department's Urban Planning Authority .
 Approving construction of new buildings and authorising use of land for various purposes.
 Improvement of the town's economic and Social status.
 Arrangements of water supply towards commercial, residential and industrial purposes.
 Planning for fire contingencies through Fire Service Departments.
 Creation of solid waste management, public health system and sanitary services.
 Working for the development of ecological aspect like development of Urban Forestry and making guidelines for environmental protection.
 Working for the development of weaker sections of the society like mentally and physically handicapped,old age and gender biased people.
 Making efforts for improvement of slums and poverty removal in the town.

Revenue sources 

The following are the Income sources for the Corporation from the Central and State Government.

Revenue from taxes 
Following is the Tax related revenue for the corporation.

 Property tax.
 Profession tax.
 Entertainment tax.
 Grants from Central and State Government like Goods and Services Tax.
 Advertisement tax.

Revenue from non-tax sources 

Following is the Non Tax related revenue for the corporation.

 Water usage charges.
 Fees from Documentation services.
 Rent received from municipal property.
 Funds from municipal bonds.

Revenue from taxes 
Following is the Tax related revenue for the corporation.

 Property tax.
 Profession tax.
 Entertainment tax.
 Grants from Central and State Government like Goods and Services Tax.
 Advertisement tax.

Revenue from non-tax sources 

Following is the Non Tax related revenue for the corporation.

 Water usage charges.
 Fees from Documentation services.
 Rent received from municipal property.
 Funds from municipal bonds.

See also
List of municipal corporations in India

External links
official website

References

Municipal corporations in Madhya Pradesh
Jabalpur
1992 establishments in Madhya Pradesh